Carex planispicata is a tussock-forming species of perennial sedge in the family Cyperaceae. It is native to eastern parts of the United States.

See also
List of Carex species

References

planispicata
Plants described in 1999
Flora of Arkansas
Flora of Missouri
Flora of Delaware
Flora of Louisiana
Flora of Alabama
Flora of Georgia (U.S. state)
Flora of Mississippi
Flora of Virginia
Flora of North Carolina
Flora of New Jersey
Flora of Tennessee
Flora of Illinois
Flora of Indiana
Flora of Texas
Flora of Maryland
Flora of West Virginia
Flora of Pennsylvania
Flora of Oklahoma
Flora of Ohio
Flora of Kentucky